Il Baretti was an Italian language monthly literary magazine which was one of the publications launched and edited by Piero Gobetti. The magazine was published in Turin in the period between 1924 and 1928. The title was a reference to Giuseppe Baretti, who was an author in the eighteenth century, an exile and pre-romantic pilgrim.

History and profile
Il Baretti was first published in Turin on 23 December 1924. It was the third and last publication started by Piero Gobetti. It was started as a four-page literary supplement of Gobetti's other magazine La Rivoluzione Liberale. He used the magazine to continue his critical approach towards Fascism after the closure of La Rivoluzione Liberale in 1925. Gobetti directed the magazine from its start in 1924 to until his death in February 1926. Then Santino Caramella and Piero Zanetti took over the magazine and directed it until its closure in December 1928. The magazine came out monthly. Major contributors included Leone Ginzburg, Benedetto Croce, Eugenio Montale and Gaetano Salvemini.

References

External links

1924 establishments in Italy
1928 disestablishments in Italy
Defunct literary magazines published in Italy
Italian-language magazines
Magazines established in 1924
Magazines disestablished in 1928
Magazines published in Turin
Monthly magazines published in Italy